The 1994 International cricket season was from May 1994 to September 1994.

Season overview

May

New Zealand in England

July

South Africa in England

August

Pakistan in Sri Lanka

September

1994 Singer World Series

References

1994 in cricket